Fairmont Municipal Airport may refer to:

 Fairmont Municipal Airport (Minnesota) in Fairmont, Minnesota, United States
 Fairmont Municipal Airport (West Virginia) in Fairmont, West Virginia, United States